For The Weird By The Weird is the first full-length from American grindcore band Bad Acid Trip. The album was self-released in 1999 by the band and then re-released in 2004 when Bad Acid Trip signed to System of a Down vocalist's label Serjical Strike in 2004. The re-release made no changes to the track listing.

Track listing

Personnel
Bad Acid Trip
 Dirk Rogers — vocals
 Keith Aazami — guitars, banjos, vocals
 Chris Mackie — bass
 Carlos neri — drums

2004 albums
Bad Acid Trip albums